Yangxin County is a county of northwestern Shandong province, People's Republic of China. It is under the administration of the prefecture-level city of Binzhou.

Administrative divisions
As 2012, this County is divided to 6 towns and 3 townships.
Towns

Townships
 Sudian Township
 Shuitapo Township
 Yanghu Township

Climate

Transportation 
The area is served by Yangxin railway station.

References

External links
 Official site

Counties of Shandong
Binzhou